James Fisher Trotter (November 5, 1802March 9, 1866) was a United States senator from Mississippi.

Early life
James Fisher Trotter was born on November 5, 1802, in Brunswick County, Virginia. He moved to eastern Tennessee, attended private schools, and studied law. He was admitted to the bar in 1820.

Career
Trotter commenced practice in Hamilton, Mississippi, in 1823. He owned slaves. From 1827 to 1829 he was a member of the Mississippi House of Representatives  and a member of the Mississippi Senate from 1829 to 1833. In 1833 he was judge of the circuit court of Mississippi; he was later appointed as a Democrat to the U.S. Senate to fill the vacancy caused by the resignation of John Black and served from January 22 to July 10, 1838, when he resigned.

From 1839 to 1842, Trotter was judge of the Mississippi Supreme Court, having been appointed to fill the vacancy caused by the resignation of Justice Daniel W. Wright, and then elected in 1839 to a six-year term. He resigned in 1842 and moved to Holly Springs, where he resumed the practice of law. He was vice chancellor of the northern district of Mississippi from 1855 to 1857, and was professor of law at the University of Mississippi from 1860 to 1862. He was appointed circuit judge in 1866 and served until his death later that year.

Death
Trotter died on March 9, 1866, in Holly Springs, Mississippi. He was buried at the Hillcrest Cemetery.

References

External links

1802 births
1866 deaths
People from Brunswick County, Virginia
American people of Scottish descent
Democratic Party United States senators from Mississippi
Democratic Party members of the Mississippi House of Representatives
Democratic Party Mississippi state senators
Justices of the Mississippi Supreme Court
Mississippi lawyers
American slave owners
People from Tennessee
People from Holly Springs, Mississippi
19th-century American politicians
19th-century American judges
19th-century American lawyers
University of Mississippi people
Burials at Hillcrest Cemetery
United States senators who owned slaves